Tisotumab vedotin, sold under the brand name Tivdak, is an antibody-drug conjugate used to treat cervical cancer. It is a combination of tisotumab, a monoclonal antibody against tissue factor, and monomethyl auristatin E (MMAE), a potent inhibitor of cell division. It is administered by infusion into a vein.

Tisotumab vedotin was approved for medical use in the United States in September 2021. The U.S. Food and Drug Administration considers it to be a first-in-class medication.

Adverse effects 
In the United States, Tivdak carries a black box warning for ocular toxicity, which occurs in up to 60% of treated patients. In clinical trials, the most common forms of ocular toxicity were dry eye, conjunctivitis, corneal damage, and blepharitis.

Other common adverse effects include bleeding (occurring in approximately 60% of patients, most often nosebleed) and peripheral neuropathy (42% of patients). Like all drugs containing MMAE, tisotumab vedotin can cause inflammation of the lungs.

Mechanism of action 

The antibody portion of tisotumab vedotin (tisotumab) binds to and forms a complex with tissue factor, a molecule expressed on the surface of cancer cells. This complex is then taken up into the cell, where tisotumab vedotin is broken down by proteolytic cleavage, releasing MMAE, which stops the cell cycle and kills the cell by apoptosis.

History 
Tisotumab vedotin was developed by Genmab in Utrecht, the Netherlands, and Copenhagen, Denmark, with the code name TF-011-MMAE. In September 2021, tisotumab vedotin was granted accelerated approval by United States Food and Drug Administration for the use of recurrent or metastatic cervical cancer with disease progression on or after chemotherapy.

Society and culture

Names 
Tisotumab vedotin is the international nonproprietary name. Tivdak is the brand name for tisotumab vedotin in the United States.

References

External links 
 
 
 
 
 

Antibody-drug conjugates
Monoclonal antibodies for tumors